Farm to Market Road 1952 (FM 1952) is a state highway in the U.S. state of Texas. The highway begins at U.S. Route 90 Alternate (US 90A) at Tavener in Fort Bend County and goes north, then west, then north again to State Highway 36 (SH 36) at Wallis in Austin County. The two-lane highway is also named Tavener Road.

Route description
FM 1952 begins at a stop sign at US 90A in Tavener, crosses the Union Pacific Railroad tracks and goes north . At this location, FM 1489 forks to the right while FM 1952 forks to the left into a 90-degree turn to the west. FM 1952 runs west for about  then begins a 90-degree bend to the north that takes up . The road then turns slightly to the northeast for the final  before ending at a stop sign at SH 36 in the eastern part of Wallis. The extension of the road to the north beyond the BNSF Railway crossing is called Tenth Street.

History
On April 7, 1953, FM 1952 was canceled and its right-of-way was transferred to FM 1512. The designation of the current FM 1952 was made on April 24, 1953. The highway was to start at SH 36 in Wallis and go south  to the Fort Bend County line.

Major intersections

Gallery

See also

References

1952
Transportation in Austin County, Texas
Transportation in Fort Bend County, Texas